Rajas Engineering College (formerly known as The Indian Engineering College) is situated in Vadakkangulam, Tamil Nadu state of India. It is one of the oldest self financing Engineering College in Tamil Nadu. REC along with its sister institutions are managed by 'The Selvam Educational and Charitable Trust' and 'The Rajas Educational and Charitable Trust', Vadakkangulam.

REC is currently affiliated to Anna University, Chennai (previously affiliated to Manonmaniam Sundaranar University, Tirunelveli). Dr.S.A.Joy Raja is the  Chairman  of this college.

References

External links
 http://www.rajas.edu

Engineering colleges in Tamil Nadu
Colleges affiliated to Anna University
Education in Tirunelveli district